UFC 80: Rapid Fire was a mixed martial arts (MMA) event held by the Ultimate Fighting Championship (UFC), that took place on January 19, 2008, at the Metro Radio Arena in Newcastle, United Kingdom.

Background
The main event was originally scheduled as an interim lightweight championship fight; however, then-lightweight champion Sean Sherk was stripped of his title after the California State Athletic Commission upheld his suspension for testing positive for the anabolic steroid Nandrolone. With the lightweight championship vacated, the Penn vs. Stevenson bout was altered to be for the undisputed lightweight championship.

Results

Bonus awards
At the end of this event, $35,000 was awarded to each of the fighters who received one of these three awards.

Fight of the Night: Paul Taylor vs. Paul Kelly
Knockout of the Night: Wilson Gouveia
Submission of the Night: B.J. Penn

See also
 Ultimate Fighting Championship
 List of UFC champions
 List of UFC events
 2008 in UFC

References

External links
 UFC 80 Website
 UFC 80 fight card

Ultimate Fighting Championship events
2008 in mixed martial arts
Mixed martial arts in the United Kingdom
Sport in Newcastle upon Tyne
2008 in England